Robert Goodell Brown (1923–2013) was renowned in field of forecasting, specifically with major contributions of work regarding exponential smoothing. He was an International Institute of Forecasters member, and a past director. He contributed to the field of forecasting with practical books.

References

External links
Obituary 
International Institute of Forecasters

1923 births
2013 deaths
American statisticians